Priscila Uppal (October 30, 1974 – September 5, 2018) was a Canadian poet, novelist, fiction writer, and playwright.

Personal life and career
Uppal was born in Ottawa, Ontario, she graduated from Hillcrest High School in 1993. She earned her Honours Bachelor of Arts (BA Hons.) in 1997 and her Ph.D in 2004 at York University as well as a Master's degree (MA) in English from the University of Toronto.

Uppal was a professor in the Department of English at York University in Toronto and taught literature and creative writing.

In 2007, her book of poetry Ontological Necessities was shortlisted for the Griffin Poetry Prize. Uppal's poetry collection Pretending to Die (2001) was shortlisted for the ReLit Award, and her memoir Projection: Encounters with My Runaway Mother was shortlisted for the Hilary Weston Writers' Trust Prize for Nonfiction in 2013. She served as the first poet-in-residence for the Rogers Cup Tennis Tournament in 2011. She was also the Olympic poet-in-residence at the 2010 Vancouver Winter Games and the 2012 London Summer Olympics. As a result of her role as the poet-in-residence for the London Summer Olympics, she was dubbed "Canada's coolest poet" by Time Out London magazine. Uppal also became a Fellow of the Royal Society of Canada in 2016.

Uppal died of synovial sarcoma on September 5, 2018.

Bibliography
Poetry
 
 
 
 
Cover Before Striking, Lyricalmyrical Press, 2004, 
 Holocaust Dream, MacLaren Arts Centre, 2005,  (photographs by Daniel Ehrenworth)
  (shortlisted for the 2007 Canadian Griffin Poetry Prize)
 Traumatology, Exile Editions, 2010, 
 Winter Sport: Poems, Mansfield Press, 2010, 
Successful Tragedies, Bloodaxe Books, 2010, 

Fiction
 The Divine Economy of Salvation, Algonquin Books of Chapel Hill, 2002, ; Doubleday Canada, 2003, 
 To Whom It May Concern, Doubleday Canada, 2009, 
 Cover Before Striking, Dundurn Press, 2015, 

Non-fiction
 
 Projection, Dundurn Press, 2013, 

Anthologies – as editor
 The Exile Book of Canadian Sports Stories, Exile Editions, 2010, 
 The Exile Book of Poetry in Translation: Twenty Canadian Poets Take on the World, Exile Editions, 2009, 
 Barry Callaghan: Essays on his Works, Guernica, 2007, 
 Uncommon Ground: A Celebration of Matt Cohen – 2002 (edited with Graeme Gibson, Wayne Grady, and Dennis Lee)
 Red Silk: An Anthology of South Asian Canadian Women Poets, Mansfield Press, 2004,  (edited with Rishma Dunlop)

Anthologies – as contributor
 Alphabet City 11: Trash
 Body Language: A Head to Toe Anthology
 Certain Things About My Mother: Daughters Speak
 In the Dark: Stories from the Supernatural
 Larger Than Life
 Mentor's Canon: poems about / for / after writers
 New Canadian Poetry
 Writer's Gym

Plays

What Linda Said

References

External links
Priscila Uppal archives are held at the Clara Thomas Archives and Special Collections, York University Libraries, Toronto, Ontario

Canadian women novelists
Canadian women poets
Canadian people of Indian descent
Writers from Ottawa
1974 births
2018 deaths
Canadian writers of Asian descent
20th-century Canadian poets
21st-century Canadian poets
21st-century Canadian novelists
Canadian memoirists
Canadian women dramatists and playwrights
20th-century Canadian dramatists and playwrights
21st-century Canadian dramatists and playwrights
Canadian women memoirists
20th-century Canadian women writers
21st-century Canadian women writers
Deaths from synovial sarcoma
Deaths from cancer in Ontario
Neurological disease deaths in Ontario
Fellows of the Royal Society of Canada
University of Toronto alumni
York University alumni
Academic staff of York University